Rooty Toot Toot is a 1951 American black comedy musical film noir cartoon directed by John Hubley. It was released by Columbia Pictures and produced by UPA. Annette Warren provides the voices of both Frankie and Nelly Bly.  Thurl Ravenscroft is the voice of Johnny and Honest John the Crook.

Summary
The short retells the classic popular song "Frankie and Johnny". Frankie is on trial for the murder of her piano-playing lover, Johnny. The prosecuting attorney accuses her of shooting Johnny "rooty toot toot/right in the snoot." Nellie Bly the singer ("That's a lie! That's a lie! She's no singer!" shouts Frankie) claims she witnessed the shooting. The case is looking bad for Frankie until her lawyer, Honest John the Crook, spins a wild story  involving innocent Frankie, a jealous Johnny, and an incredible ricochet. Honest John then declares that if Frankie were free, he would take her for his wife. The jury convenes and finds Frankie "not guilty." Frankie is thrilled, until she sees Honest John walking away with Nellie Bly. She quickly picks up Exhibit A (the gun) and shoots Honest John "rooty toot toot/right in the snoot" in front of the entire court room. The prosecuting attorney celebrates as the police escort Frankie to jail.

Reception and legacy
It received a nomination for the Academy Award for Best Animated Short Film in 1951, but lost out to Tom and Jerry's 6th award-winning cartoon The Two Mouseketeers. 

In 1994 it was voted #41 of the 50 Greatest Cartoons of all time by members of the animation field.

References

External links
 
 Rooty Toot Toot at the Big Cartoon Database

Films about death
1951 animated films
Adult animation
American adult animated films
American animated short films
American courtroom films
American musical films
Animated musical films
Films directed by John Hubley
UPA films
1950s American animated films
1951 short films
1951 films
Columbia Pictures animated short films
Columbia Pictures short films
American black comedy films
1950s English-language films
Film noir cartoons